The  is a Japanese bank based in Kyoto. The bank operates mainly in the Kansai region with more than 165 branches in Kyoto, Osaka, Shiga, Nara, Hyogo, Aichi and Tokyo prefectures.

The bank offers several banking services such as deposits, loans, commodity trading, securities investment, domestic and foreign exchange services. Other business operations include the operation and leasing of real estate, commercial support services, manpower dispatching, credit guarantee services, credit card services, economic survey and consulting services. Founded on 1 October 1941, it now has 3,428 employees.

The bank is listed in the Tokyo Stock Exchange and has a market capitalization of 430 billion Japanese Yen (US$3.82 billion) as of 5 December 2017.

References

External links

 

Regional banks of Japan
Companies based in Kyoto
Companies listed on the Tokyo Stock Exchange